Zhaoqing Hengtai Football Club is an amateur Chinese football club that currently participates in the Chinese Champions League. The team is based in Zhaoqing and currently uses Century Lotus Stadium of Foshan as their home stadium.

History
Zhaoqing Hengtai was founded in 2012 by retired footballer and college students of Guangdong. They advanced to the Chinese FA Cup for the first time in 2014 and were knocked out in the second round when they lost to China League One club Hunan Billows in the penalty shoot-out. On 1 October 2017, Zhaoqing Hengtai won promotion to China League Two after which they advanced to semi-finals of the 2017 China Amateur Football League by beating Qinghai Zhuangbo in the penalty shoot-out. However, they gave up the opportunity to turn professional and remained at the amateur league.

Results
All-time league rankings

As of the end of 2017 season.

Key
 Pld = Played
 W = Games won
 D = Games drawn
 L = Games lost
 F = Goals for
 A = Goals against
 Pts = Points
 Pos = Final position

 DNQ = Did not qualify
 DNE = Did not enter
 NH = Not Held
 WD = Withdrawal
  – = Does Not Exist
 R1 = Round 1
 R2 = Round 2
 R3 = Round 3
 R4 = Round 4

 F = Final
 SF = Semi-finals
 QF = Quarter-finals
 R16 = Round of 16
 Group = Group stage
 GS2 = Second Group stage
 QR1 = First Qualifying Round
 QR2 = Second Qualifying Round
 QR3 = Third Qualifying Round

References

Football clubs in China
Association football clubs established in 2012
Football clubs in Guangdong
Zhaoqing
2012 establishments in China